Michal Kovář (born 8 September 1973, in Olomouc) is a Czech footballer. As of August 2012, he plays for 1. HFK Olomouc. He spent two seasons in the Bundesliga with F.C. Hansa Rostock. He represented his country at under-21 level between 1994 and 1995.

Career

Kovář started his career with Sigma Olomouc.

References

External links
 
 

Living people
1973 births
Association football defenders
Czech footballers
Czech Republic under-21 international footballers
Czech First League players
SK Sigma Olomouc players
1. HFK Olomouc players
SSV Reutlingen 05 players
FC Hansa Rostock players
Bundesliga players
2. Bundesliga players
Fotbal Fulnek players
Sportspeople from Olomouc